Barrows: Freedom Fighter is a documentary film shot in 2016 that centers on how Barbados was led to their independence on November 30, 1966.

It won the Africa Movie Academy Award for Best Diaspora Documentary in 2018.


Synopsis 
The story of how Barbados after more than 300 years of being a British colony finally gained independence, led by 'The Right Excellent Errol Walton Barrow' on November 30, 1966 is revealed.

Cast 

 Lisa Arrindell-Carolyn Barrow
 Sean Field-Mr. Brathwaite
 Eric Holder-Narrator (as Eric Holder Jr.)
 Adrian Holmes-Errol Barrow
 Robert Christopher Riley-Jean Holder
 Nadia Sarmova-Bank Teller

References 

2010s English-language films